T. M. Anbarasan is an Indian politician. He is the current minister for Rural
Industries, Cottage Industries, Small Industries, Slum clearance board in the Indian state of Tamil Nadu Government. He is district DMK secretary of Kancheepuram. He had been elected to the Tamil Nadu assembly thrice.

Early life
Tha Mo Anbarasan was born to Textile merchant Tha. Mohalingam Sengundha Mudaliar in Kundrathur on 21 April 1960. He had finished PUC education. At his school days he joined DMK party and started his political career.

Political career 
He defeated B. Valarmathi of AIADMK during the 2006 assembly election in Alandur constituency.

The elections of 2016 resulted in him winning the Alandur constituency again.
He is a famous politician in Tamil Nadu.

Electoral performance

References 

Dravida Munnetra Kazhagam politicians
Living people
1960 births
Tamil Nadu ministers
Tamil Nadu MLAs 2016–2021
Tamil Nadu MLAs 2021–2026
Tamil Nadu politicians